{{infobox Settlement
|name = Rembang Regency
|native_name = Kabupaten Rembang
|image_skyline = 
|image_caption = 
|image_shield = 
|image_flag = 
|image_map = 
|map_caption = Location within Central Java
|subdivision_type = Country
|subdivision_name = Indonesia
|subdivision_type1 = Province
|subdivision_name1 = Central Java
|population_total = 
|population_as_of = 2020
|population_density_km2 = auto
|population_footnotes =
|population_note = 
|area_total_km2 = 1,035.70
|seat_type = Capital
|seat = Rembang
|government_footnotes = 
|government_type = 
|governing_body = 
|leader_party = 
|leader_title = Regent
|leader_name = Abdul Hafidz
|leader_title1 = Vice Regent
|leader_name1 = Mochamad Hanies Cholil Barro
|timezone1 = IWST
|utc_offset1= +7
|postal_code_type = Postal code
|postal_code = 
|area_code_type = Area code
|area_codes = (+62) 295, 356
|website = 
|type = Regency
|coordinates = 
|pushpin_map = Indonesia Java#Indonesia
|pushpin_map_caption = Location in Java##Location in Indonesia
}}
Rembang Regency is a regency on the extreme northeast coast of Central Java Province, on the island of Java (bordering on the Java Sea) in Indonesia. The regency covers an area of 1,035.70 km2 on Java. Its capital city is Rembang.

Geography

The Solo River flows through its inland section.

The regency is crossed by the North Coast Road, an inter-province main road on the island.

Borders
Rembang Regency is bordered by:
North : Java Sea
East : Tuban Regency in East Java Province
South : Blora Regency
West : Pati Regency

Population

The Regency had a population of 591,359 people at the 2010 Census, 618,780 at the 2015 Census and 645,333 at the 2020 Census, of whom 324,593 were male and 320,740 were female.

Administrative districts
The regency is divided into fourteen districts (kecamatan), tabulated below with their areas and their populations at the 2010 Census, together with the results of the 2020 Census. The table also includes the locations of the district administrative centres, the number of administrative villages (rural desa and urban kelurahan'') in each district, and its post code.

Climate
Rembang has a tropical monsoon climate (Am) with moderate to little rainfall from May to October and heavy rainfall from November to April.

Lasem

During the colonial Dutch East Indies period, the area was known as Lasem.

The Han family of Lasem was a prominent Chinese immigrant family of colonial government bureaucrats and landlords in the area.

References

External links

 

Regencies of Central Java
Java Sea
Solo River
Han family of Lasem